Rumman or Rummanah is the Arabic language word for 'pomegranate'.

Rumman or Rummanah may refer to:

Places

Israel/Palestine
Rumana, Israel, SWP map 6
Rummanah, a Palestinian village in the Jenin Governorate, SWP map 8
Kafr Rumman, a Palestinian town in the Tulkarm Governorate, SWP map 11
Rammun, a Palestinian town in the Ramallah and al-Bireh Governorate, SWP map 14

Elsewhere
Ras Rumman, a neighborhood of Manama, Bahrain
Rumana subdistrict, Iraq
Ain El Remmaneh, a suburb of Beirut, Lebanon
Abu Rummaneh, a neighborhood west of Damascus, Syria

Other
Rumman Zia, Pakistani film maker

See also
Rimmon
Ruman (disambiguation)
Rumana (disambiguation)

Arabic words and phrases